Rhynchopyga albigutta is a species of moth in the subfamily Arctiinae. It is found in Peru.

References

Moths described in 1915
Euchromiina